Akei, or Tasiriki, is an Oceanic dialect chain spoken on the southwest coast of Espiritu Santo Island in Vanuatu.

References

Espiritu Santo languages
Languages of Vanuatu